Nephrurus amyae, also known commonly as the Centralian rough knob-tail gecko or the Centralian rough knob-tailed gecko, is a species of lizard in the family Carphodactylidae. It is the largest gecko in the genus Nephrurus, and like all species of Nephrurus is endemic to Australia.

Etymology
The specific name, amyae, is in honor of Amy Couper, daughter of Australian herpetologist Patrick J. Couper.

Geographic range
N. amyae is found primarily in the central portion of Australia (sometimes referred to as Centralia), including in Northern Territory and in extreme eastern Western Australia.

Habitat
The preferred natural habitats of N. amyae are desert and rocky areas.

Description
N. amyae generally has a brown to reddish color and a small tail with a knob on the end.

Reproduction
N. amyae is oviparous.

References

External links
Western Australia Museum . Nephrurus amyae . 2006. Retrieved 4 December 2007.

Further reading
Cogger HG (2014). Reptiles and Amphibians of Australia, Seventh Edition. Clayton, Victoria, Australia: CSIRO Publishing. xxx + 1,033 pp. .
Couper CJ, Gregson RAM (1994). "Redescription of Nephrurus asper Günther, and description of N. amyae sp. nov. and N. sheai sp. nov." Memoirs of the Queensland Museum 37 (1): 53–67. ("Nephrurus amyae Couper", new species, pp. 60–63, Figure 4).
Wilson S, Swan G (2013). A Complete Guide to Reptiles of Australia, Fourth Edition. Sydney: New Holland Publishers. 522 pp. .

Nephrurus
Geckos of Australia
Reptiles described in 1994
Taxa named by Patrick J. Couper
Taxa named by Robert A. M. Gregson